Dubauli is a village in Garhani block of Bhojpur district, Bihar, India. As of 2011, its population was 1,017, in 158 households.

References 

Villages in Bhojpur district, India